The Nicolaus Copernicus Monument in Kraków is a notable landmark of Kraków, Poland.  It memorializes the astronomer Copernicus, who studied at the Kraków Academy and whose father came from that city, then the capital of Poland.

The statue, designed by sculptor Cyprian Godebski in 1899, was completed in 1900.  It originally stood in the courtyard of the Jagiellonian University's Collegium Maius. In 1953 it was moved to Kraków's Planty Park, in front of the Collegium Witkowski building.

See also
Nicolaus Copernicus Monument in Toruń
Nicolaus Copernicus Monument in Warsaw

External links

1900 sculptures
Buildings and structures in Kraków
Culture in Kraków
Monuments and memorials in Poland
Outdoor sculptures in Poland
Jagiellonian University
Tourist attractions in Kraków
Cultural depictions of Nicolaus Copernicus
Monuments and memorials to scientists